The 1994 Swedish Golf Tour, known as the Lancôme Tour for sponsorship reasons, was the ninth season of the Swedish Golf Tour, a series of professional golf tournaments for women held in Sweden.

1994 was the fourth year with Lancôme as the main sponsor. Åsa Gottmo won two tournaments and her first Order of Merit.

Schedule
The season consisted of 8 tournaments played between May and August, where one event was included on the 1994 Ladies European Tour.

Order of Merit

Source:

See also
1994 Swedish Golf Tour (men's tour)

References

External links
Official homepage of the Swedish Golf Tour

Swedish Golf Tour (women)
Swedish Golf Tour (women)